Warren Eddington (born 14 October 1955) is a New Zealand former cricketer. He played in seven first-class matches for Canterbury from 1977 to 1985.

See also
 List of Canterbury representative cricketers

References

External links
 

1955 births
Living people
New Zealand cricketers
Canterbury cricketers
People from Methven, New Zealand
Cricketers from Canterbury, New Zealand